Courtney Hoffos (born 30 August 1997) is a Canadian freestyle skier who competes internationally in the ski cross discipline.

Career
Hoffos had a fifth-place finish at the 2021 World Championships. Hoffos has won multiple World Cup medals.

On January 24, 2022, Hoffos was named to Canada's 2022 Olympic team.

References

External links 
 

1997 births
Living people
Sportspeople from British Columbia
Canadian female freestyle skiers
Freestyle skiers at the 2022 Winter Olympics
Olympic freestyle skiers of Canada